Norma Sharp (born July 20, 1943) is an American operatic soprano. She is known for singing Mozart and Richard Strauss, but also sang Wagner roles at the Bayreuth Festival.

Career 

Sharp was born in Shawnee, Oklahoma, and studied voice and musicology at the University of Kansas. Her voice, termed lyric and "" (spinto), led to preferred interpretation of roles in operas by Mozart and Richard Strauss.

She appeared in London at Covent Garden,  in Glasgow at the Scottish Opera and in 1978 at the Glyndebourne Festival as Donna Anna in Mozart's Don Giovanni. She sang the part of the countess in Mozart's  at her debut at La Scala in Milan.

In Parsifal, she sang one of the flower maidens.

In recital, she is focused on German romantic and contemporary Lieder, accompanied by pianists such as Irwin Gage, Wilhelm von Grunelius and Wolfram Rieger.

Selected recordings 

Sharp appeared in her Bayreuth performances on film – the Ring cycle filmed in 1980 and Parsifal in 1982.

References

External links 
 
 Norma Sharp black-international-cinema.com

Living people
American operatic sopranos
1943 births
People from Shawnee, Oklahoma
University of Kansas alumni
Academic staff of the Hochschule für Musik Hanns Eisler Berlin
Hochschule für Musik und Theater Hamburg alumni
Hochschule für Musik und Tanz Köln alumni
American expatriates in Germany
American women academics
21st-century American women